Samuel Merrill may refer to:
 Samuel Merrill (Indiana politician) (1792–1855), early leading figure in Indiana
 Samuel Merrill (Iowa governor) (1822–1899), Republican Governor of Iowa from 1868 to 1872
 Samuel Merrill III (born 1939), political scientist and mathematician
 Sam Merrill (born 1996), NBA basketball player, currently of the Memphis Grizzlies
Samuel Ingham Merrill (1856–1932), California businessman and philanthropist